Acacia silvestris, commonly known the Bodalla silver wattle, is a tree of the genus Acacia and the subgenus Botrycephalae. It is native to an area in south eastern New South Wales and coastal Victoria.

Description
It has smooth grey bark that can have a mottled appearance. The terete branchlets are scarcely ridged and densely covered with white to grey hairs. The green leaves dry to a silvery colour as they dry. It flowers from July to September producing yellow inflorescences in axillary or terminal panicles.

Distribution
A. silvestris is endemic to south eastern Australia from around Bodalla State Forest in New South Wales in the north down to around the highlands in East Gippsland in Victoria where it is often situated on rocky hillsides alongside steep gullies, on alluvial flats and on the saddle of ridges where it grows in a range of soils over slate where it is usually part of open Eucalyptus forest communities and can form extensive forests.

See also
 List of Acacia species

References

silvestris
Flora of New South Wales
Flora of Victoria (Australia)
Taxa named by Mary Tindale
Plants described in 1957